2213 Meeus, provisional designation , is a bright background asteroid from the inner regions of the asteroid belt, approximately  in diameter. It was discovered on 24 September 1935, by Belgian astronomer Eugène Delporte at the Royal Observatory of Belgium in Uccle. The presumed S-type asteroid has a short rotation period of 2.65 hours. It was named for Belgian amateur astronomer and meteorologist Jean Meeus.

Orbit and classification 

Meeus is a non-family asteroid of the main belt's background population when applying the hierarchical clustering method to its proper orbital elements. Based on osculating Keplerian orbital elements, the asteroid has also been classified as a member of the Flora family, a giant asteroid family and the largest family of stony asteroids in the main-belt.

It orbits the Sun in the inner main-belt at a distance of 1.7–2.7 AU once every 3 years and 3 months (1,190 days; semi-major axis of 2.2 AU). Its orbit has an eccentricity of 0.23 and an inclination of 5° with respect to the ecliptic. The body's observation arc begins with its official discovery observation at Uccle in 1935.

Physical characteristics 

Meeus is an assumed stony S-type asteroid.

Rotation period 

In August 2013, a rotational lightcurve of Meeus was obtained from photometric observations by Italian astronomers of the Tuscolana Association of Astronomy . Lightcurve analysis gave a rotation period of 2.651 hours with a brightness amplitude of 0.19 magnitude.

Diameter and albedo 

According to the survey carried out by the NEOWISE mission of NASA's Wide-field Infrared Survey Explorer, Meeus measures between 4.59 and 5.194 kilometers in diameter and its surface has a high albedo between 0.3467 and 0.439.

The Collaborative Asteroid Lightcurve Link assumes an albedo of 0.24 – derived from 8 Flora, the parent body of the Flora family – and calculates a diameter of 5.67 kilometers based on an absolute magnitude of 13.4.

Naming 

This minor planet was named after Belgian amateur astronomer and professional meteorologist Jean Meeus (born 1928), who, in 1986, received the Amateur Achievement Award of the Astronomical Society of the Pacific. The official naming was proposed by Eric S. Fogelin (see 2181), Jay U. Gunter and Edward Bowell, and published by the Minor Planet Center on 1 August 1981.

References

External links 
 Asteroid Lightcurve Database (LCDB), query form (info )
 Dictionary of Minor Planet Names, Google books
 Discovery Circumstances: Numbered Minor Planets (1)-(5000) – Minor Planet Center
 
 

002213
Discoveries by Eugène Joseph Delporte
Named minor planets
19350924